Thomas Batchcroft (1572-1662) was Master of Gonville and Caius College, Cambridge. On 15 April 1649 Dr Batchcroft was ejected from the mastership of Caius  but returned in 1660.

Offices Held

References

1662 deaths
Fellows of Gonville and Caius College, Cambridge
Masters of Gonville and Caius College, Cambridge
Year of birth unknown
1572 births